Veliki Rakitovec is a small settlement of a few farms in the hills south of the Tuhinj Valley in the Municipality of Kamnik in the Upper Carniola region of Slovenia.

References

External links

Veliki Rakitovec on Geopedia

Populated places in the Municipality of Kamnik